Daria Makarenko (born 7 March 1992) is a former Russian footballer. She played as a defender for Zvezda 2005 Perm and the Russia national team.

Club career
She played for Zvezda 2005 Perm since 2012. Twice during her career, she scored a goal from practically the center pitch.

International career
She took part in 2011 UEFA Women's U-19 Championship. She was called up to be part of the national team for the UEFA Women's Euro 2013.

Personal life
Makarenko was born in Sibirtsevo 2-ye, Vengerovsky District, Novosibirsk Oblast.

Honours
Zvezda 2005 Perm
Winner
 Russian Women's Cup: 2012, 2013

References

External links
 
 
 
 Profile at soccerdonna.de 

1992 births
Living people
Russian women's footballers
Russia women's international footballers
Zvezda 2005 Perm players
Women's association football defenders
Ryazan-VDV players
Russian people of Ukrainian descent
Russian Women's Football Championship players
UEFA Women's Euro 2017 players